Rosholt may refer to:

 Rosholt (surname)
 Rosholt, Wisconsin, a town in Portage County, Wisconsin
 Rosholt, South Dakota, a town in Roberts County, South Dakota